Dahivali may refer to:
 Dahivali, Mawal, Pune, Maharashtra, India
 Dahivali, Ratnagiri, Maharashtra, India